Look Away is a 2018 Canadian psychological horror drama film. It tells the story of Maria, an alienated high-school student whose life is turned upside down when she switches places with her sinister mirror image. The film is written and directed by Assaf Bernstein, and stars India Eisley, Mira Sorvino and Jason Isaacs.

Plot
17-year-old Maria Brennan is a timid high school student, shunned by her peers and bullied by her schoolmate Mark. Her only friend is the unpleasant Lily; she also harbours a secret crush on Lily's boyfriend, Sean. At home, Maria suppresses her emotions around her parents: her distant father Dan is a philandering plastic surgeon and an obsessive perfectionist, and her mother Amy suffers from depression and nightmares.

Maria accidentally discovers a sonogram of twins. In the bathroom, her reflection begins to move on its own, terrifying Maria. She attempts to discuss it with her parents the following morning; however, they brush her off.

After dreaming of her own birth, Maria's reflection begins talking to her, calling herself Airam, and telling Maria she can take her sadness away. Airam is charismatic, assertive, and confident. Maria asks who she is, and Airam simply says she has "always been here".

Dan offers to give her an early birthday present; when she arrives at his office the next day to receive her gift, he tells her he's going to perform cosmetic surgery to fix her "flaws". Crushed, she begins to find solace in Airam's presence and support in confronting her inner feelings. Amy senses that something is wrong with Maria, but is repeatedly shut down by Dan.

Lily takes her for a skating lesson for the upcoming on-ice winter prom, but after Maria slips and is unable to get back up, Lily simply taunts her then abandons her on the ice. Finally, Maria is humiliated and physically assaulted by Mark at the prom.

Devastated by these events, Maria goes into the bathroom to find Airam. Their palms and lips touch, allowing them to switch places. Amy has a nightmare about giving birth.

At school, Airam is visibly more confident than Maria, even standing up to Mark. She arranges for Amy to run into her husband's mistress as a way of forcing her to acknowledge Dan's affairs and their superficial marriage. Maria, stuck in the mirror, is appalled by Airam's behavior, but Airam insists she is only being honest, and tells Maria that all of them must answer for their sins.

Airam lures Mark to the shower and breaks his knee. After secretly practicing figure skating alone, Airam has another lesson with Lily, who becomes intimidated by the way Airam is acting. When Airam chases Lily across the ice, Lily falls into the pavement, fatally crushing her skull. In the bathroom that evening, Maria frantically begs to switch, but Airam reiterates that Maria wanted Lily out of their lives. Maria asks again who she is, but Airam only replies, "You know me". Airam then seduces Sean, and the two begin an intense relationship. Airam begins living more wildly, smoking marijuana, skipping school, and drinking alcohol.

While at a motel together, Sean gets a phone call telling him the police want to speak to him and Maria. Airam refuses to go, and Sean becomes suspicious. He picks up his jacket to leave, and in a moment of impulse and fear, Airam hits him over the head with a vodka bottle, killing him. Deeply upset, she sits against the mirror in the bathroom and she and Maria cry together.

Amy has another dream about giving birth. It is revealed that Maria originally had a twin sister, who was euthanised after birth by Dan due to her supposed physical deformities, against Amy's pleas.

Airam leaves the motel and confronts Dan at the clinic after hours, pretending to be heavily intoxicated. She strips naked and demands to know if he would still love her if she were deformed. Clearly perturbed by the question, he finally answers "yes", and she slits his throat with a scalpel. As he lies dying, she cries and asks, "Why couldn't you love me?"

Airam now no longer sees Maria when she looks into the mirror. Frightened and alone, Airam returns home and crawls onto the bed next to her mother. A series of mirrored burst shots depicts Maria and Airam on the bed together with their mother; implying that Maria and Airam merged into one.

Cast
 India Eisley as Maria and Airam; Maria is a social outcast who is always made fun of by her peers; Airam is Maria's reflection and deceased twin, who gives her support to handle her peer pressure and later takes her place to murder everyone who tormented Maria.
 Mira Sorvino as Amy, Maria's mother who suffers from depression
 Jason Isaacs as Dan, Maria's distant father
 Penelope Mitchell as Lily, Maria's best friend
 Harrison Gilbertson as Sean, Lily's boyfriend who is secretly Maria's crush
 John C. MacDonald as Mark, Maria's bully and tormentor

Production
In August 2016, before filming commenced and over two years before the film was completed and released, Variety reported the production under the working title Behind the Glass. Look Away, which marked director Assaf Bernstein's first North American film, was produced by Bernstein, Giora "Gig" Kaplan, Brad Kaplan and Dana Lustig. Filming took place in Winnipeg, Manitoba.

Release
The film was released on October 12, 2018.

Response

Box office
Look Away grossed $1.1 million internationally, plus $13,592 in home video sales.

Critical reception
The film received generally negative reviews.  Noel Murray of the Los Angeles Times said, "the pace was too slow, and the mood too somber." There were some positive reviews, including Without Your Head's Michael J. Epstein, who said it was, "not only an absolutely worthy extension of its base, but a thematically driven joy, far denser and smarter than its teen-appeal look gives it credit for."

References

External links

2018 films
English-language Canadian films
Canadian serial killer films
Patricide in fiction
2018 horror films
Canadian independent films
Regency Enterprises films
Vertical Entertainment films
Films set in Manitoba
Films set in Winnipeg
Films about twin sisters
2010s English-language films
2010s Canadian films